Andrew C. Taylor is a U.S. businessman. He was born in 1947.  He is the executive chairman of Enterprise Holdings. Taylor is the son of Jack C. Taylor, who founded Enterprise Rent-A-Car in 1957.

Early life and career

Taylor first began working at Enterprise washing cars when he was 16. He would work during holiday vacations and learn the business from the ground up during summer breaks.

In 1970, Taylor earned a Bachelor of Business Administration from the University of Denver. After graduation, he sought experience outside the family business and worked at RLM Leasing, a Ford Motor Company affiliate based in San Francisco, CA. He spent three years there before returning to St. Louis and Enterprise Rent-A-Car.

Enterprise Rent-A-Car

Between 1970–1976, Taylor worked his way up through the company. In 1976, he was promoted to General Manager of the St. Louis region. In 1980, he took the position of President and Chief Operating Officer. In 1990, Andy was promoted to Chief Executive Officer and then Chairman in 2001. Enterprise grew from a fleet of 5,000 cars to more than 900,000 vehicles internationally during his tenure. With the purchase of Vanguard Automotive Group, Enterprise gained both National Car Rental and Alamo Rent A Car. The combined fleet is over 1.5 million vehicles rented out by roughly 100,000 employees.

References 

Living people
University of Denver alumni
Enterprise Holdings
1947 births